Rayil Sneham ( Train friendship}}) is an Indian Tamil-language travel series focusing on China. Each episode highlights the history, culture, architecture and wildlife of China. This 3 season series has all original footage. It is hosted by Nithiya Rao. It aired every Tuesday at 9:00PM SST on MediaCorp Vasantham from 18 October 2016 to 10 January 2017 for 13 episodes.

List of Episodes

Broadcast
Series was released on 18 October 2016 on Mediacorp Vasantham. It aired in [Singapore] on Mediacorp Vasantham, Its full length episodes and released its episodes on their app Toggle, a live TV feature was introduced on Toggle with English Subtitles.

References

External links 
 Vasantham Official Website
 Vasantham Facebook

Vasantham TV original programming
Tamil-language television shows in Singapore
Tamil-language travel shows
Tamil-language talk shows
Tamil-language reality television series
2016 Tamil-language television series debuts
2017 Tamil-language television series endings
2016 Singaporean television seasons
2017 Tamil-language television seasons